Patty Hayes (born January 12, 1955) is an American professional golfer who played on the LPGA Tour.

Hayes won once on the LPGA Tour in 1981.

Professional wins

LPGA Tour wins (1)

References

External links

American female golfers
LPGA Tour golfers
ALPG Tour golfers
1955 births
Living people
21st-century American women